2019 European Baseball Championship - B-Pool was the second tier of Confederation of European Baseball men competition. It featured 14 teams, competing in two groups of 6 and 8 teams in early July 2019. The two group winners, Team Israel and Team Lithuania, faced off in the 2019 European Baseball Playoff Series for the last qualifying spot for the 2019 European Baseball Championship, with Team Israel prevailing.

Teams
Nine teams remained from the 2017 Pool B competition:

 
 
 
 
 
 
 
 
 

Five additional teams advanced from 2018 Pool C.

Group 1 - Trnava

Pool A

Pool B

Play-Offs

Semifinals
Semifinals order will be switched, because home team advanced to this round.

3rd-place game

Finals

Classification round – Pool C

Final standings

Group 2 - Blagoevgrad

Final

Final standings

Teams advancing to playoffs

References

External links
CEB official site
2019 Pool B Trnava Site
2019 Pool B Blagoevgrad Site

Qualifier European Baseball Championship
European Baseball Championship – Qualification